Febrifugine is a quinazolinone alkaloid first isolated from the Chinese herb Dichroa febrifuga, but also found in the garden plant Hydrangea. Laboratory synthesis of febrifugine determined that the originally reported stereochemistry was incorrect.

Febrifugine has antimalarial properties and the synthetic halogenated derivative halofuginone is used in veterinary medicine as a coccidiostat. Other synthetic febrifugine  derivatives have been used against malaria, cancer, fibrosis, and inflammatory disease.

References 

Quinazolinones
Piperidine alkaloids